John Mole (born 1941) is an English poet for adults and children, born in Taunton. Some of his poems present political issues to young people. He is also a jazz clarinetist.

Poetry
Mole has won several prizes for his poetry, including an Eric Gregory Award, the Cholmondeley Award, and the Signal Award for children's poetry. He is a writer in residence at Magdalene College, Cambridge and a poet in residence to the Poets Society in the City of London. He is also a poet in residence for the Poet in the City charity scheme.

Mole's many poems for children include "Variations on an Old Rhyme" and "The Balancing Man". Both of these discuss political issues in a way that points out their relevance to young people.

Treatment is a string of poems that amounts to a personal response to a course of chemotherapy he underwent.

A reading of his poetry for the Poetry Archive appeared on CD. It was made on 30 April 2003 at the Audio Workshop, London, and produced by Richard Carrington. His three published volumes of verse have been The Love Horse (Eric Morten, 1973), A Partial Light (Dent, 1975) and On a Ship (Secker & Warburg, 1979).

Libretto
Mole wrote the libretto for Alban, a community opera composed by Tom Wiggall and performed in May 2009 in St Albans Cathedral. It was performed again in Holborn, London, in the autumn of 2010.

References

20th-century English poets
1941 births
Living people
Writers from London
English male poets
Children's poets
20th-century English male writers
21st-century English poets
21st-century English male writers